The Motor Carrier was an English automobile built only in 1904.  Designed as a 6 hp "pleasure car", it could be converted into a goods vehicle capable of carrying 900 lb (400 kg).

See also 
 List of car manufacturers of the United Kingdom

References
David Burgess Wise, The New Illustrated Encyclopedia of Automobiles.

Defunct motor vehicle manufacturers of the United Kingdom
Cars introduced in 1904